The Caquetá Territory was a national territory of the Republic of New Granada and the subsequent states of the Granadine Confederation and the United States of Colombia from 1845 to 1886. Its capital was Mocoa.

History
The Caquetá Territory was created on May 2, 1845, as a national territory of the Republic of New Granada. Its territory was carved out of the Popayan Province.

In the 1863 constitution it was made a part of the Cauca State.

In 1886, the territory was disestablished and its lands transferred to Gran Cauca.

See also 
 Caquetá Department

Former subdivisions of Colombia